South Atlantic tropical cyclones are unusual weather events that occur in the Southern Hemisphere. Strong wind shear, which disrupts the formation of cyclones, as well as a lack of weather disturbances favorable for development in the South Atlantic Ocean, make any strong tropical system extremely rare, and Hurricane Catarina in 2004 is the only recorded South Atlantic hurricane in history. Storms can develop year-round in the South Atlantic, with activity peaking during the months from November through May. Since 2011, the Brazilian Navy Hydrographic Center has assigned names to tropical and subtropical systems in the western side of the basin, near the eastern coast of Brazil, when they have sustained wind speeds of at least , the generally accepted minimum sustained wind speed for a disturbance to be designated as a tropical storm in the North Atlantic basin. Below is a list of notable South Atlantic tropical and subtropical cyclones.

Theories concerning infrequency of occurrence
It was initially thought that tropical cyclones did not develop within the South Atlantic. Very strong vertical wind shear in the troposphere is considered a deterrent. The Intertropical Convergence Zone drops one to two degrees south of the equator, not far enough from the equator for the Coriolis force to significantly aid development. Water temperatures in the tropics of the southern Atlantic are cooler than those in the tropical north Atlantic.

Although they are rare, during April 1991 the United States' National Hurricane Center (NHC) reported that a tropical cyclone had developed over the Eastern South Atlantic. In subsequent years, a few systems were suspected to have the characteristics needed to be classified as a tropical cyclone, including in March 1994 and January 2004. During March 2004, an extratropical cyclone formally transitioned into a tropical cyclone and made landfall on Brazil, after becoming a Category 2 hurricane on the Saffir–Simpson hurricane wind scale. While the system was threatening the Brazilian state of Santa Catarina, a newspaper used the headline "Furacão Catarina", which was originally presumed to mean "furacão (hurricane) threatening (Santa) Catarina (the state)". After international presses started monitoring the system, "Hurricane Catarina" has formally been adopted.

At the Sixth WMO International Workshop on Tropical Cyclones (IWTC-VI) in 2006, it was questioned if any subtropical or tropical cyclones had developed within the South Atlantic before Catarina. It was noted that suspect systems had developed in January 1970, March 1994, January 2004, March 2004, May 2004, February 2006, and March 2006. It was also suggested that an effort should be made to locate any possible systems using satellite imagery and synoptic data; however, it was noted that this effort may be hindered by the lack of any geostationary imagery over the basin before 1966. A study was subsequently performed and published during 2012, which concluded that there had been 63 subtropical cyclones in the Southern Atlantic between 1957 and 2007. During January 2009, a subtropical storm developed in the basin, and in March 2010, a tropical storm developed, which was named Anita by the Brazilian public and private weather services. In 2011, the Brazilian Navy Hydrographic Center started to assign names to tropical and subtropical cyclones that develop within its area of responsibility, to the west of 20°W, when they have sustained wind speeds of at least .

Known storms and impacts

Pre-2010s

1991 Angola tropical storm

A low-pressure area formed over the Congo Basin on 9 April. The next day it moved offshore northern Angola with a curved cloud pattern. It moved westward over an area of warm waters while the circulation became better defined. According to the United States National Hurricane Center, the system was probably either a tropical depression or a tropical storm at its peak intensity. On 14 April, the system rapidly dissipated, as it was absorbed into a large squall line. This is the only recorded tropical cyclone in the eastern South Atlantic.

Hurricane Catarina

Hurricane Catarina was an extraordinarily rare hurricane-strength tropical cyclone, forming in the southern Atlantic Ocean in March 2004. Just after becoming a hurricane, it hit the southern coast of Brazil in the state of Santa Catarina on the evening of 28 March, with winds estimated near  making it a Category 2-equivalent cyclone on the Saffir–Simpson hurricane scale. Catarina killed 3 to 10 people and caused millions of dollars in damage in Brazil.

At the time, the Brazilians were taken completely by surprise, and were initially skeptical that an actual tropical cyclone could have formed in the South Atlantic. Eventually, however, they were convinced, and adopted the previously unofficial name "Catarina" for the storm, after Santa Catarina state. This event is considered by some meteorologists to be a nearly once-in-a-lifetime occurrence.

2010s

Tropical Storm Anita

On 8 March 2010, a previously extratropical cyclone developed tropical characteristics and was classified as a subtropical cyclone off the coast of southern Brazil. The following day, the United States Naval Research Laboratory began monitoring the system as a system of interest under the designation of 90Q. The National Hurricane Center also began monitoring the system as Low SL90. It was declared a tropical storm on 10 March and became extratropical late on 12 March. Anita's accumulated cyclone energy was estimated at 2.0525 by the Florida State University. There was no damage associated to the storm, except high sea in the coasts of Rio Grande do Sul and Santa Catarina. Post mortem, the cyclone was given the name "Anita" by private and public weather centers in Southern Brazil.

Subtropical Storm Arani

Early on 14 March 2011, the Navy Hydrographic Center-Brazilian Navy (SMM), in coordination with the National Institute of Meteorology, were monitoring an organizing area of convection near the southeast coast of Brazil. Guided by a trough and a weak ridge to its north, the system moved slowly southeastward over an area of warm waters, intensifying into Subtropical Cyclone Arani on 15 March, as named by the Brazilian Navy Hydrographic Center, and achieving its lowest pressure. The storm was classified as subtropical, as the convection was east of the center. On 16 March, Arani began experiencing  of wind shear because another frontal system bumped it from behind. As it moved east-southeastwards, it achieved its highest winds as it transitioned back to an extratropical cyclone, process that was concluded on early 17 March.  

Before it developed into a subtropical cyclone, Arani produced torrential rains over portions of southeastern Brazil, resulting in flash flooding and landslides. Significant damage was reported in portions of Espírito Santo, though specifics are unknown. Increased swells along the coast prompted ocean travel warnings.

Subtropical Storm Bapo

During the next day, low-level baroclinity decreased around the system, as it moved southeastwards away from the Brazilian coast and into anomalously warm waters, where it intensified further. The system was named Bapo by the Brazilian Navy Hydrography Center during 6 February as it had intensified into a subtropical storm. Over the next couple of days the system continued to move south-eastwards, achieving its peak intensity just before it transitioned into an extratropical cyclone during 8 February.

Subtropical Storm Cari

On 10 March 2015, the Hydrographic Center of the Brazilian Navy began issuing warnings on Subtropical Depression 3 during early afternoon, while the Center for Weather Forecast and Climatic Studies (CPTEC in Portuguese) already assigned the name Cari for the storm. At 00:00 UTC on 11 March, the Hydrographic Center of the Brazilian Navy upgraded Cari to a subtropical storm, also assigning this name to it. On 12 March, the Brazilian Hydrographic Center downgraded Cari to a subtropical depression as it achieved its lowest pressure, while the CPTEC stated that the storm had become a "Hybrid cyclone" as it moved away from the continental coastline. During early afternoon of 13 March, the Brazilian Navy declared that Cari became a remnant low.

Cari brought heavy rainfall, flooding and landslides to eastern cities of Santa Catarina and Rio Grande do Sul states as it interacted with a South Atlantic Convergence Zone. A Navy buoy registered a  wave off the coast of Santa Catarina.

Subtropical Storm Deni

On 15 November 2016, instability areas associated with a trough axis over Rio de Janeiro's coastline led to the formation of a subtropical depression southwest of it. It intensified into a subtropical storm and received the name Deni on 16 November. Moving south-southeastwards, Deni soon became extratropical shortly before 00:00 UTC on 17 November, where it was absorbed by a mid-latitude frontal system.

Subtropical Storm Eçaí

An extratropical cyclone entered the South Atlantic Ocean from Santa Catarina early on 4 December 2016. Later, it intensified quickly and then transitioned into a subtropical storm shortly before 22:00 BRST (00:00 UTC on 5 December), with the name Eçaí assigned by the Hydrographic Center of the Brazilian Navy. Eçaí started to decay on 5 December as it moved Into cooler waters, and weakened into a subtropical depression at around 00:00 UTC on 6 December. As it decayed and lost its subtropical characteristics, its center divided in two, with the new center moving away southeastwards and the old one degrading into a remnant frontal low.

Subtropical Storm Guará

According to the Brazilian Navy Hydrographic Center, on 8 December 2017 a South Atlantic Convergence Zone aligned with a through axis led to the formation of several instability areas. On 9 December a subtropical storm formed from this setup, on border between Espírito Santo and Bahia, moving southeastwards away from land. On late 10 December, a Cold front pushed Guará southwards towards cooler waters, where it started transitioning into an extratropical cyclone. On early 11 December Guará attained its peak intensity, shortly thereafter degenerating into a low-pressure area associated with a through axis.

Tropical Storm Iba

According to the Brazilian Navy Hydrographic Center, on 22 March 2019, a low-pressure area formed off the coast of Bahia after the passage of a frontal system. On the next day, the cyclone developed a deep warm-core, thus being designated as a tropical depression. On 24 March, the system intensified into a tropical storm, receiving the name Iba from the Brazilian Navy Hydrographic Center. After moving southwestward for a couple of days, on 26 March, Iba reached its peak intensity. Afterward, a  Cold front approached the storm, which intensified the wind shear around it, leading to its weakening and extratropical transition. On early 28 March, Iba degenerated into a remnant low, becoming fully extratropical a day later.

Iba was the first tropical storm to develop in the basin since Anita in 2010, as well as the first fully tropical system to be named from the Brazilian naming list.

Subtropical Storm Jaguar

According to the Brazilian Navy Hydrographic Center, on 19 May 2019 several instability areas formed from a through axis off the coast of Espírito Santo, which later coalesced into a subtropical depression. On 20 May, the system strengthened into a subtropical storm, receiving the name Jaguar from the Brazilian Navy Hydrographic Center. However, the system did not intensify any further, as it soon encountered unfavorable conditions while moving southeastwards, weakening into a subtropical depression on early 21 May. Later that day, Jaguar degenerated into several sparse instability areas associated with a low-pressure area, which was absorbed by a frontal system on 22 May.

2020s

Subtropical Storm Kurumí 

On 21 January 2020, the Brazilian Navy Hydrographic Center began to monitor an area of persisting thunderstorms near São Paulo for potential subtropical cyclone development. Generally tracking southeastward, the system began to organize within the afternoon hours of 22 January, aided by the establishment of a South Atlantic Convergence Zone, and was designated a subtropical depression in the early hours of 23 January. Several hours later, due to a lack of wind shear, the system intensified into a subtropical storm and was given the name Kurumí. After this bout of intensification, Kurumí moved southward and began to succumb to much more unfavorable conditions. It weakened back to a subtropical depression on late 24 January, due to a intensification of wind shear over its circulation due to the formation of a extratropical cyclone to its southeast. The last advisory was issued on Kurumí later that same day, as it degenerated into a through while also beginning to merge with the nearby frontal system.

The front associated with Kurumí later played a role in the 2020 Brazilian floods and mudslides, dragging behind it heavy rainfall. Over 171.8 mm (6.76 in) of rain fell in the Belo Horizonte metro area on 24 January, triggering a landslide and killing 3 people and leaving 1 missing.

Subtropical Storm Mani

According to the Hydrographic Center of the Brazilian Navy, on 24 October 2020, a through axis persisted off the coast of the border between Espírito Santo and Bahia, which led to the formation of a subtropical depression on the next day. Later that day it intensified into a subtropical storm, which led it to be named Mani at 00:00 UTC on 26 October. As it moved away from a South Atlantic Convergence Zone on 27 October, Mani gradually lost its subtropical characteristics, until it weakened to a low pressure area.

The storm caused significant damage in Espírito Santo, with landslides of stones and earth leaving more than 400 people homeless. The storm also impacted almost the entire state of Minas Gerais and the northern region of Rio de Janeiro.

Subtropical Storm Oquira

According to the Hydrographic Center of the Brazilian Navy, on 26 December 2020, the prior presence of a South Atlantic Convergence Zone and the subsequent passage of a frontal system led to the presence of several instability areas off the coast east of Rio Grande do Sul, which coalesced into a subtropical depression a day later. Later that day, the system's winds intensified, and it was named Oquira by the Brazilian Hydrographic Center. Later that day, Oquira transitioned into an extratropical low, and the Hydrographic Center issued their final advisory on the storm as it was absorbed by a frontal system.

Tropical Storm 01Q

On 4 February 2021, an extratropical storm off the coast of Rio Grande do Sul developed into a bomb cyclone. On 6 February, the storm began separating from its weather fronts and developed subtropical characteristics, before fully separating from the frontal zone and transitioning into a fully-tropical storm later that day. As a result, the NOAA classified the system as a tropical storm at 17:30 UTC, with the system being designated as Tropical Storm 01Q. However, the storm was short-lived, as it lost its tropical characteristics several hours later, with the NOAA issuing their final bulletin on the storm at 23:30 UTC that day. The storm dissipated soon afterward. Although the NOAA issued bulletins on the storm, the Hydrographic Center of the Brazilian Navy did not monitor it.

Subtropical Depression 01-2021

For the next few days, the storm slowly meandered southeastward and then southwestward alongside a trough axis to its east, until it lost its subtropical characteristics over high seas on 17 February, becoming a remnant low.

The Brazilian Navy noted in its post-season analysis that on late 14 February the system could have intensified into a subtropical storm, since the radiometer built into the AMSR-2 satellite found winds of 35 knots, but it wasn't upgraded because no other measurement confirmed such findings.

Subtropical Storm Potira

A low south of Rio de Janeiro transitioned into a subtropical depression on 19 April 2021.
On 20 April 2021, the system intensified into a subtropical storm,  which made the Brazilian Navy name it Potira. Potira moved slowly northeastwards for a couple of days over unusually warmer waters, favorable upper-level tropospheric winds and strong low-level convergence, which led to its intensification and persistence of its peak intensity until 23 April. As it completed a clockwise loop, Potira weakened into a subtropical depression, with the Brazilian Navy downgrading it to a low-pressure area on late 24 January.

In the municipalities of Balneário Camboriú and Florianópolis (SC), the hangover caused by Potira caused flooding in the streets and damage to the sidewalks. The ports of Itajaí and Navegantes were closed for 3 days. No economic or material damage caused by the cyclone has been reported.

Subtropical Storm Raoni 

On the next day, the cyclone acquired a warm seclusion while intensifying, while it moved westwards and separated from the frontal system it was previously attached to. As the system occluded, the seclusion deepened and started to acquire subtropical characteristics, which led it to be designated as a subtropical storm on 29 June. It remained unnamed due to it being outside of the Brazilian Navy's area of responsibility. By 23:30 UTC on 28 June, the Satellite Products and Services Division of the NESDIS declared the system to have become a tropical storm, based on a Dvorak rating of 3.5, assigning a invest tag to it. Although being affected by strong wind shear to its north due to a subtropical jet caused by the presence of a frontal system nearby, it further intensified and achieved a minimum pressure , while tracking northeastwards towards the Brazilian area of authority. At around 12:00 UTC on the next day, as the storm entered the boundary of METAREA V, Brazilian Navy's area of responsibility, thus it was assigned the name Raoni. Continuing moving northeastwards, Raoni further developed an eye feature as well as a robust band to the east of the system. Raoni began to weaken by 30 June, as the subtropical jet broke the barotropic flow over it, and NESDIS dropped the tag as it lost its convective bands. On 1 July, Raoni lost its subtropical characteristics and degenerated into a low-pressure area.

The area's waters were also rough due to the storm. Downpours with continuous gales were also experienced in Uruguay's capital Montevideo. From 24 June to 2 July, Raoni channeled cold air from Antarctica into portions of South America, leading to an unusually potent cold wave across Argentina, Uruguay, Paraguay, Bolivia, and Brazil, with the temperature dropping as much as 15 °C (27 °F) below average in some areas. The combination of the cyclone and the cold wave also produced snowfall across the southern portion of South America, with snowfall observed as far north as southern Brazil.

Subtropical Storm Ubá

On 9 December 2021, instability areas remained off the coast of Espírito Santo and Rio de Janeiro after the passage of a frontal system and a South Atlantic Convergence Zone. Overnight the system coalesced into a occluded front, which transitioned into a subtropical depression. On the morning of the next day, the system was upgraded to subtropical storm status, receiving the name Ubá. On 11 December Ubá gradually weakened while moving southeastwards, being downgraded to depression status. It degenerated into a remnant low-pressure area on the next day.

Subtropical Storm Yakecan

On 15 May 2022, an extratropical cyclone moved through the southern region of Brazil and stopped offshore. The low occluded and separated form its precursor extratropical cyclone, obtaining subtropical characteristics in the process. On the morning of 17 May, the cyclone fully transitioned into a subtropical storm, and was given the name Yakecan. Taking a more northwestwardly movement, Yakecan moved away from the coastline, gradually losing its subtropical characteristics. On late 19 May, it acquired frontal characteristics and transitioned to a extratropical cyclone.

During its trajectory, the storm caused snow in the Gaúcha and Catarinense Mountains, setting record lows for this time of year. Two people died in Uruguay and Brazil due to the passage of the cyclone. Yakecan is the last name from the regular naming list, which has been in use since 2011.

Other systems

Pre-2004

According to a presentation at the Sixth WMO International Workshop on Tropical Cyclones (IWTC-VI), satellite imagery from January 1970 showed that a system with an eyewall had developed behind a cold front and that the system needed further analysis to determine if it was tropical or subtropical. On 27 March 1974, a weak area of low pressure that had originated over the Amazon River started to intensify further. Over the next 48 hours the system quickly developed further and was classified as subtropical, as it developed a banding structure and deep convection near its warm core. On 29 March, a north-westerly flow encroached on the systems environment, which caused the system to rapidly move towards 40S and the cold waters that were present to the south of 40°S.

In March 1994, a system that was thought to be weaker than Catarina was spawned but was located over cool and open waters. According to the Zambia Meteorological Department, Cyclone Bonita moved off the coast of Angola and entered the South Atlantic Ocean on 19 January 1996. By the next day, the system had succumbed to cold waters and days of land interaction, dissipating completely. It was the first tropical cyclone known to have traversed southern Africa from the South-West Indian Ocean to the South Atlantic.

2004–2009
During 2004, the large-scale conditions over the South Atlantic were more conducive than usual for subtropical or tropical systems, with 4 systems noted. The first possible tropical cyclone developed within a trough of low pressure, to the southeast of Salvador, Brazil on 18 January. The system subsequently displayed a small central dense overcast (CDO) and was suspected to be at the peak of its development as either a tropical depression or a tropical storm during the next day. The system was subsequently affected by some strong shear, before it moved inland and weakened along the coast of Brazil before it was last noted during 21 January. Within Brazil the system caused heavy rain and flooding with a state of emergency declared in Aracaju, after the river overflowed and burst its banks which flooded homes, destroyed crops and caused parts of the highway to collapse. However, it was noted that not all of the heavy rain and impacts were attributable to the system, as a large monsoon low covered much of Brazil at the time. The second system was a possible hybrid cyclone that developed near south-eastern Brazil between 15 and 16 March. Hurricane Catarina was the third system, while the fourth system formed off the coast of Brazil on 15 May 2004.

However, there were questions about how tropical the system was, as it did not separate from the westerlies or the baroclinic zone it was in. Between 11 and 17 March 2006, another system with a warm core developed and moved southward along the South Atlantic Zone, before dissipating.

Two subtropical cyclones affected both Uruguay and Rio Grande do Sul state in Brazil between 2009 and 2010. On 28 January 2009, a cold-core mid to upper-level trough in phase with a low-level warm-core low formed a system and moved eastward into the South Atlantic. The weather station owned by MetSul Weather Center in Morro Redondo, Southern Brazil, recorded  in a 24-hour period. The storm caused fourteen deaths and the evacuation of thousands, with an emergency declared in four cities. It lasted until 1 February, when the cyclone became extratropical.

2010–2016

On 16 November 2010, a cold-core mid to upper-level trough in phase with a low-level warm-core low developed a low-pressure system over Brazil, and moved southeastward into the South Atlantic, where it slightly deepened. The system brought locally heavy rains in southern Brazil and northeast of Uruguay that exceeded 200 millimeters within a few hours, in some locations of Southern Rio Grande do Sul, northwest of Pelotas. Damages and flooding were observed in Cerrito, São Lourenço do Sul and Pedro Osório. Bañado de Pajas, departament of Cerro Largo in Uruguay, recorded  of rain. The subtropical cyclone then became a weak trough on 19 November, according to the CPTEC.

Between 23 December 2013 and 24 January 2015, the CPTEC and Navy Hydrography Center monitored four subtropical depressions to the south of Rio de Janeiro. The first one lasted until Christmas Day, 2013. Two subtropical depressions formed in 2014: one in late-February 2014 and the other in late-March 2014. A fourth one formed in late January 2015.

On 5 January 2016, the Hydrographic Center of the Brazilian Navy issued warnings on a subtropical depression that formed east of Vitória, Espírito Santo. On the next day, the system strengthened into a tropical depression, and other agencies considered the system an invest, designating it as 90Q; however, on 7 January, the tropical depression dissipated.

2021–present
On 3 January 2021, according to the Météo-France, the remnants of Tropical Storm Chalane from the South-West Indian Ocean crossed southern Africa and briefly emerged into the eastern South Atlantic before dissipating.

Without affecting any area and moving away from the Brazilian coast, it lost its subtropical characteristics in the afternoon of 10 January, according to the Brazilian Navy Hydrography Center.

Storm names
The following names are published by the Brazilian Navy Hydrographic Center's Marine Meteorological Service and used for tropical and subtropical storms that form in the area west of 20ºW and south of equator in the South Atlantic Ocean. Originally announced in 2011, the list has been extended from ten to fifteen names in 2018. The names are assigned in alphabetical order and used in rotating order without regard to year. The names of significant tropical or subtropical systems will be retired. As of 2022, all regular names were used.

Retirements 
Kamby was replaced by Kurumí in 2018 without being used.

Climatological statistics 
There have been 88 recorded tropical and subtropical cyclones in the South Atlantic Ocean since 1957. Like most southern hemisphere cyclone seasons, most of the storms have formed between November and May.

See also

 Unusual areas of tropical cyclone formation
 List of South America hurricanes
 Southern Hemisphere tropical cyclone
 Atlantic hurricane (North Atlantic tropical cyclone)
 Atlantic Equatorial mode
 Mediterranean tropical-like cyclone
 Tropical cyclone basins
 2006 Central Pacific cyclone
 1996 Lake Huron cyclone
 Subtropical Cyclone Katie
 Subtropical Cyclone Lexi

References

External links

 Brazilian Navy Hydrography Center – Marine Meteorological Service 
 NOAA info on South Atlantic Tropical Cyclones
 CIMSS Satellite Blog: "Another tropical cyclone in the South Atlantic Ocean?"
 Meteogroup Weathercast: Do hurricanes form in the South Atlantic?
 Satellite animation of the 1991 Angola tropical storm
 

 
 
Tropical cyclone meteorology
Climate of Brazil